"Recession Proof" is the fourteenth episode of the seventh season of the American medical drama House. It aired on February 28, 2011.

Plot

A patient is admitted after breaking out in a severe rash triggered by caustic chemical exposure at his blue-collar job. As the team treats him, they discover that he has led his wife to believe that he is still maintaining his once-lucrative real estate career.  He is finally diagnosed with Cryopyrin-associated periodic syndrome but dies before he can be treated.

Meanwhile, Cuddy is honored with an award and needs House to be at the charity event for support, but his attendance is threatened when his patient's battle to survive forces him to question his practice and his own happiness. Also, Chase and Masters teach each other a lesson in forging meaningful personal and professional relationships.

Reception

Critical Response  
The A.V. Club gave this episode a C− rating.

References

External links 

 "Recession Proof" at Fox.com
 

House (season 7) episodes
2011 American television episodes
Television episodes directed by S. J. Clarkson